John Whitley Neill (15 May 1934 – 21 August 2019) was captain of the Great Britain Field Hockey team at the Mexico Olympics in 1968.  Born in Surrey, England, he played a record 56 times for Great Britain between 1960 and 1968 including 3 Olympic games. He played his club hockey for Bowdon Hockey Club.

Neill was also a Director of the family brewing and distilling company Greenall Whitley plc.

References

External links
 

British male field hockey players
Olympic field hockey players of Great Britain
1934 births
2019 deaths
Field hockey players at the 1968 Summer Olympics
Field hockey players at the 1964 Summer Olympics
Field hockey players at the 1960 Summer Olympics
Sportspeople from Surrey